Honorinus is a monotypic snout moth genus described by Carl Heinrich in 1956. Its only species, Honorinus fuliginosus, described by the same author in the same year, is found in Peru.

References

Phycitinae
Monotypic moth genera
Moths of South America
Taxa named by Carl Heinrich
Pyralidae genera